Cedar Shores is an unincorporated community in Bosque County, in the U.S. state of Texas. According to the Handbook of Texas, the community had a population of 170 in 2000.

History
William Holloman, the owner of the American Resort Development, contributed to the development of the community in the 1960s by convincing people to buy lake houses along the shores of Lake Whitney. It was originally named Cedar Shores Estates for the surrounding landscape and covered  of land. Lake houses covered , while the other  were used for swimming and picnic areas, playgrounds, and marinas. Its population was 150 in 1970 and grew to 170 from 1980 through 2000. Its name was changed to Cedar Shores in 2000.

Geography

Education
Cedar Shores is served by the Morgan Independent School District.

References

Unincorporated communities in Bosque County, Texas
Unincorporated communities in Texas